Gábor Rajos (born 17 March 1984) is a Hungarian football player who currently plays for FC Ajka.

Szombathelyi Haladás  
He has Spent 3 years in the Hungarian second Division appearing for 57 matches and scoring 2 goals before his team was promoted to the Hungarian First Division.

Honours  
Hungarian Second Division:  Winner: 2008

Club statistics

Updated to games played as of 1 June 2014.

References 
HLSZ

1984 births
Living people
Sportspeople from Szombathely
Hungarian footballers
Association football midfielders
Szombathelyi Haladás footballers
FC Ajka players
Nemzeti Bajnokság I players